Charles Waite may refer to:

 Charlie Waite (born 1949), English photographer
 Charles Burlingame Waite (1824–1909), American lawyer, jurist and author
 C. B. Waite (1861–1927), American photographer